Brent Johnson (born 1977) is an American former ice hockey player.

Brent Johnson may also refer to:

 Brent Johnson (American football) (born 1963), American football center
 Brent Johnson (Canadian football) (born 1976), Canadian football defensive lineman